Erich Weise (4 September 1895 – April 1972) was a German  historian and archivist. During World War II, as a member of the Nazi Party, he administered Polish archives captured by Nazi Germany. In this position he purged people he considered "non-Aryans," used Jewish slave labor, and committed the war crime of plundering Polish historical documents.

Early life 

Weise was born in Krefeld in the Rhineland and raised in  Prussian Königsberg (Kaliningrad), where he studied at the  Albertina.  Weise's studies were interrupted by World War I, during which he spent three years in Russian internment in Mitau. It is possible that his internment damaged his hearing and led to his eventual deafness.  After the war Weise resumed his studies in Königsberg.

Interwar years 
In 1921 Weise qualified as a grammar-school teacher. He never worked in this profession, though, due to illness. In the same year he defended his Ph.D. dissertation in history which he made under the direction of Albert Brackmann, the leading proponent of German expansionism in the East, acquisition of so-called "Lebensraum" and the Ostforschung program among archivists in Germany.  He began his career as an archivist in Berlin from 1922–1927, in Düsseldorf from 1927–1930 and then in Königsberg from 1930–1935.  Weise joined the Nazi Party in 1933.  He was promoted to Staatsarchivrat in 1935 and, back in Berlin, worked as a division head in the Prussian Privy State Archives.

Before the war he published articles with Nazi historian Erich Maschke, who supported Nazi racist and nationalist views.  He took part in a conference on the 3rd and 4 September 1933 in Königsberg where duties of archivists and the role of Ostforschung - an aggressively anti-Polish nationalist ideology whose publications were of questionable value were discussed. Weise, speaking on behalf of German archivists, declared loyalty to the Third Reich and its ideas:
The initial aversion of the German archivist against engaging in political matters has waned. As the keeper of the legal codes of the state and the nation, he has become the herald of the national cause...Because Germandom (Volkstum) and the spirit of the state and the decisive will for ethnic (Völkisch) survival have to be kept alive, the German archivists are fully behind the new Germany of January 30, 1933. In the spirit of the Third Reich, they work with the Volk for the Volk.

Second World War 

During the Nazi occupation of Poland Weise was responsible for administering captured Polish archives. In this function he purged archive staff of workers deemed "non-Aryan" and politically undesirable, reducing it by 50%, an accomplishment of which he was proud.  At the same time he used Jewish forced labor to carry out the transportation requirements of the archives.

In the Spring of 1940 Weise informed the remaining Polish archivists that all records from territories annexed from Poland by Nazi Germany would be confiscated. In 1942 he became head of a new archival institution founded by the Nazis in occupied Greater Poland, Reichsarchiv Posen.

In 2008 Polish authorities documented the fact that in December 1940 Weise committed, together with Kurt Forstreuter, looting of 74 antique documents from the thirteenth through the fifteenth centuries from an archive in Warsaw, which constitutes a war crime. By that time both Forstreuter and Weise had died and Polish authorities were unable to prosecute them.

Post-war career 

According to historian Astrid M. Eckert, Weise managed to get through the post-war denazification process by lying, suppressing information about his past, and successfully portraying himself as an opponent of the Nazis. He was listed as a looter by Allied authorities in the Monuments Fine Arts and Archives Section of the Military Government (MFA&A), responsible for the early process of denazification.

In West Germany Weise helped to build up the state archives in Stade (Staatsarchiv Stade). In  1948 he went to work for the state archives at Hanover. From 1959 until 1960, when he retired, he was director of the Staatsarchiv Stade. He was the editor of the book Ost- und Westpreußen (East and West Prussia) published in 1966 as one volume of  the encyclopedia Handbuch der historischen Stätten (Handbook of Historical Places). The book was criticized in Poland, especially in light of the background of the authors, who included Erich Keyser known for his incitement of hatred towards Poles before Second World War.

Historian Michael Burleigh notes that Weise's Cold War publications belonged to a historiographical genre, Ostforschung, which aimed to legitimise  traditional German chauvinism by depicting Germans as bringers of order and development in Eastern Europe in concert with other European nations.  Weise's main interests as were focused around the history of Prussia and the history of the Teutonic Order. His historical views on Teutonic Knights are considered outdated by modern historians.

His work has been criticized in Poland for neglecting political and social aspects of the territories he described while focusing on their German character.

Publications (selection) 
As author or compiler
Sammelbesprechung über neuere polnische Literatur, in: AltprF 10, 1933, S. 148
Die nationalen Aufgaben des Grenzlandarchivars, in: KB 81 (1933)
  Die alten Preußen  1936
 Deutsches Schrifterbe im Warthegau : Ein Kriegsjahr Archivpflege 1944 
Findbuch zum Bestand 27 Reichskammergericht (1500–1648). Edited with Heinz-Joachim Schulze. Vandenhoeck & Ruprecht, Göttingen 1981, .
Die Amtsgewalt von Papst und Kaiser und die Ostmission besonders in der 1. Hälfte des 13. Jahrhunderts. J. G. Herder-Institut, Marburg (Lahn) 1971.
Die Staatsverträge des deutschen Ordens in Preußen im 15. Jahrhundert. Edited Historischen Kommission für ost- und westpreußische Landesforschung. Three volumes:
 Vol. 3: 1467–1497. Gräfe und Unzer, Munich 1966.
 Vol. 2: 1438–1467. Elwert, Marburg (Lahn) 1955.
 Vol. 1: 1398–1437. Gräfe und Unzer, Königsberg 1939.
 Geschichte des Niedersächsischen Staatsarchivs in Stade nebst Übersicht seiner Bestände. Vandenhoeck & Ruprecht, Göttingen 1964.
Die Schwabensiedlungen im Posener Kammerdepartement 1799–1804. Holzner, Würzburg 1961.
Das Widerstandsrecht im Ordenslande Preussen und das mittelalterliche Europa. Vandenhoeck & Ruprecht, Göttingen 1955.
As editor
 Ernst Bahr, Wolfgang La Baume, Kurt Forstreuter et al.: Ost- und Westpreußen (Udo Arnold, ed.), the series Handbuch der historischen Stätten (= Kröners Taschenausgabe, Band 317).  Alfred Kröner Verlag, Stuttgart 1981 (unaltered reprint of the 1st edition of 1966 edited by Erich Weise), .

See also
Nazi Plunder
World War II looting of Poland

References

Nazi Party members
1895 births
1972 deaths
20th-century German historians
German archivists
People from Krefeld
German military personnel of World War I
20th-century German male writers
German male non-fiction writers